Roemeria is a genus of flowering plants in the family Papaveraceae, native to Macaronesia, Europe, the Mediterranean, North Africa, the Caucasus, the Middle East, the Arabian Peninsula, Central Asia, the western Himalayas, Xinjiang, and Mongolia. A 2006 molecular analysis revised the taxonomy of Papaver, elevating Roemeria to the genus level and showing that it is sister to Papaver sect. Argemonidium.

Species
The following species are accepted:
Roemeria argemone 
Roemeria carica 
Roemeria hybrida 
Roemeria macrostigma 
Roemeria procumbens 
Roemeria refracta

References

Papaveroideae
Papaveraceae genera
Flora of Madeira
Flora of the Canary Islands
Flora of North Africa
Flora of Europe
Flora of the Caucasus
Flora of Western Asia
Flora of the Arabian Peninsula
Flora of Central Asia
Flora of Pakistan
Flora of West Himalaya
Flora of Xinjiang
Flora of Mongolia